Rachel Zeffira (born Rachel Anne Santesso) is a Canadian soprano, composer and multi-instrumentalist, currently based in London, England. She is also one half of the duo Cat's Eyes, the other being Faris Badwan of the Horrors.

Life and work

Early life
Zeffira studied voice and organ at the Conservatorio Di Musica F.E. Dall'Abaco di Verona and oboe at the University of Victoria in Canada. She is a Fellow of the Royal Society of Arts, and in 2001, founded the Capital Children's Choir, which she also directs. Several videos of the choir's covers of contemporary songs such as "Chances" and "Untrust Us" received media attention and went viral. Zeffira released several albums with the Capital Children's Choir, and in 2015, the choir performed on the soundtrack for the film Pan. As a soprano, she released two albums, The Songs of Louis Vierne (2005) and The Sacred Heart of Nino Rota (2007).

Zeffira taught briefly at a primary school in London, where she taught a young Lily Allen, who has credited Zeffira as a mentor.

Cat's Eyes
While Zeffira was working as an opera singer and classical musician, she met Badwan. The two friends began to write songs together and formed the band Cat's Eyes. The duo made their first public appearance at the Vatican, where they performed one of their songs as a mass setting, with church organ and choir during a service at St. Peter's Basilica. Cat's Eyes were signed by Polydor in 2010 and released their eponymous debut album in April 2011. The album received positive press and critical acclaim. During this time, Zeffira appeared in Vogue magazine, and was shot by the photographer Rankin for the cover of Dazed & Confused alongside Bobby Gillespie of Primal Scream.

Solo work
Zeffira's first solo album, The Deserters, was released 10 December 2012 on RAF Records in Europe and Paper Bag Records in North America. The title track was chosen for the trailer to the final season of the TV program Skins. Zeffira received positive press for the debut
 and the album was listed in The Times Top 5 albums of 2012 in spite of its late release date.

Zeffira also received critical praise for her live performances. In June 2013. she was the opening act for Glastonbury Festival 2013.

In April 2013, Zeffira made her American radio debut on NPR's All Things Considered, and later made her Canadian radio debut with a live session on CBC Radio One show Q with Jian Ghomeshi

Film score compositions
Zeffira is listed as composer, arranger, orchestrator, conductor, musician and soprano on the Cat's Eyes soundtrack (released in February 2015) for the 2014 film The Duke of Burgundy, directed by Peter Strickland. The score received positive press and majority 5-star reviews. On 7 November 2015, it was announced that Zeffira and Badwan had won the European Film Award for Best Composer.

Discography

As conductor and choral arranger

Cat's Eyes
 Broken Glass EP (2011, Polydor)
 Cat's Eyes (2011, Polydor)
 The Duke of Burgundy (2015, RAF/Caroline International)
 Treasure House (2016, Kobalt Label Services)

Solo
 The Deserters (2012, RAF)

Singles
"Here on In" (2012, RAF)
"Break the Spell" (2012, RAF)

References

Other sources

 Lanham, Tom. "The Horrors’ Faris Badwan sees new success with Cat’s Eyes". The San Francisco Examiner. 2 February 2011.
NME interview ."Horrors' Faris Badwan launches new band at the Vatican".  24 January 2011.

External links
 Cat's Eyes official website
 WNYC interview in the Soundcheck studio

British women singers
Living people
Year of birth missing (living people)
British sopranos
Canadian sopranos
Canadian people of Italian descent
Paper Bag Records artists
21st-century British conductors (music)
21st-century women musicians